The castellum of Bădeni was a fort in the Roman province of Dacia in the 2nd and 3rd centuries AD. Its ruins are located in Bădeni in the commune of Mărtiniș in Romania.

See also
List of castra

External links
Roman castra from Romania - Google Maps / Earth

Notes

Roman Dacia
Archaeological sites in Romania
Roman legionary fortresses in Romania
Ancient history of Transylvania
Historic monuments in Harghita County